Lars Åke Zetterlund (born 11 February 1964 in Härnösand) is a Swedish former footballer. He is currently a development coach at Örebro SK.

Playing career 
Zetterlund started his career in 1979 at IF Älgarna staying one year.

He made his way to AIK Fotboll where he won the Swedish Cup in 1985.

In 1986, he moved to IFK Göteborg where he won the 1987 Swedish championship and the UEFA Cup in 1987. The UEFA medal was won in a thrilling game 2-1 on aggregate against Scottish club Dundee United. The winning and losing teams were cheered by the United fans at the end of the second leg at Tannadice Park.

He signed for Örebro SK in 1989 because of the guaranteed first-team football. He spent seven years at the Behrn Arena playing almost 150 matches.

In 1996 he moved to Dundee United where he joined up with fellow Swede Kjell Olofsson. He played 79 games for United, scoring four goals, including one in the New Firm derby.

He returned to Sweden and to Örebro in 1999 and retired in 2001. He did come out of retirement in 2003 as player-manager of IF Heimer.

Coaching career 
Zetterlund took over the reins of IF Heimer as player-manager in 2003 until 2005. He also had a short spell as manager of IFK Eskilstuna in 2006. In 2007, he became a youth development coach at Örebro SK.

Honours 
Sweden:
 Swedish Cup winner: 1984-85
 Swedish football champions: 1987
 UEFA Cup winner: 1986-87

Scotland:
 Scottish League Cup runner-up: 1997-98

External links
 Stats at Sportklubben.net 
 

Living people
1964 births
AIK Fotboll players
Dundee United F.C. players
IFK Göteborg players
Örebro SK players
Swedish footballers
Scottish Premier League players
Allsvenskan players
Expatriate footballers in Scotland
Swedish expatriate footballers
Scottish Football League players
Association football midfielders
UEFA Cup winning players
People from Härnösand
Sportspeople from Västernorrland County